Hoagland is an unincorporated census-designated place (CDP) in Madison Township, Allen County, in the U.S. state of Indiana. As of the 2010 census, it had a population of 821.

History
The post office at Hoagland has been in operation since 1872.

Geography

Demographics

Religion
Hoagland and Poe share a Methodist congregation, Hope United Methodist Church, located outside of the Hoagland CDP. There were previously two separate congregations, Hoagland United Methodist Church (originally Middletown Methodist Church) and Poe (Williamsport) United Methodist Church, which merged into Hope in 1995.

Recreation
Hoagland Days is held in June.

Education
The East Allen County Schools district includes Hoagland, and Heritage Elementary School and Heritage Junior/Senior High School are the facilities to which Hoagland is zoned.

Notable people
 Lydia Allen DeVilbiss, American physician and author, born in Hoagland

References

External links

Hoagland Area Advancement Association

Census-designated places in Allen County, Indiana
Fort Wayne, IN Metropolitan Statistical Area
Census-designated places in Indiana